Tuřany is a municipality and village in Cheb District in the Karlovy Vary Region of the Czech Republic. It has about 100 inhabitants.

Administrative parts
Villages of Lipoltov and Návrší are administrative parts of Tuřany.

References

Villages in Cheb District